Asdrúbal Chávez is a Venezuelan chemical engineer and politician, who is the former president of Citgo, a subsidiary of Venezuela's state oil company PDVSA.

He has served as deputy to the National Assembly of Venezuela and Minister of Petroleum and Mining. He is the cousin of the late president of Venezuela, Hugo Chávez. Chávez was appointed by President Nicolás Maduro to run the troubled state-run oil giant Petróleos de Venezuela, S.A. (PDVSA) in April 2020.

References

Living people
Year of birth missing (living people)
Venezuelan engineers
People from Barinas (state)
United Socialist Party of Venezuela politicians
University of the Andes (Venezuela) alumni
Presidents of PDVSA